The 2022 24 Hours of Le Mans Virtual was an esports 24-hour automobile endurance race for Le Mans Prototype (LMP) and Le Mans Grand Touring Endurance (LMGTE) vehicles held on a simulated version of the Circuit de la Sarthe from 15 to 16 January 2022.  It was hosted on the rFactor 2 gaming platform as the fifth and final race of the 2021–22 Le Mans Virtual Series. The race featured 50 teams of four drivers each sharing one car, divided into two categories of vehicles: LMP and GTE. There were 29 teams in the LMP class and 21 in the GTE category. High-profile drivers like two-time Formula One world champion Max Verstappen and IndyCar driver Juan Pablo Montoya competed in the race.

Results

Qualifying
Pole position winners in each of the two classes are indicated in bold.

Race
Class winners are denoted in bold.

References

Virtual 2022
Le Mans